The 2016 Energiewacht Tour is the 6th edition of the Energiewacht Tour, a stage race held in the Netherlands, with a UCI rating of 2.2, from 6 April to 10 April.

Teams

Stages

Stage 1
6 April 2016 – Groningen,  team time trial (TTT)

Stage 2
7 April 2016 – Winsum,

Stage 3
8 April 2016 – Stadskanaal to Musselkanaal,

Stage 4a
9 April 2016 – Zuidhorn,

Stage 4b
9 April 2016 – Leek (individual time trial),

Stage 5
10 April 2016 – Borkum,

Classification leadership table
 denotes the rider with the lowest accumulated time and is the overall race leader
 denotes the leader of the Points classification
 denotes the leader of the Sprint classification
 denotes the leader of the Combativity classification
 denotes rider with the lowest accumulated time, who is under a specified age and leader of the Youth classification
 denotes the leader of the Club rider classification, which consists of the rider with the best overall time from a non-UCI Women's team

References

External links
Official site

See also
2016 in women's road cycling

Energiewacht Tour
Energiewacht Tour
Energiewacht Tour
Healthy Ageing Tour
April 2016 sports events in Europe